Solomon Oboh (13 September 1989 – 9 June 2013) was a Nigerian footballer who played as a defender or midfielder for Warri Wolves F.C.

Death
Oboh died in a traffic collision on 9 June 2013 at the age of 23.

References

1989 births
2013 deaths
Nigerian footballers
Association football defenders
Association football midfielders
Warri Wolves F.C. players
Road incident deaths in Nigeria